Deathstalker Rebellion is a science fiction novel by British author Simon R Green.

The third in a series of nine novels, Deathstalker Rebellion is part homage to - and part parody of - the classic space operas of the 1950s, and deals with the timeless themes of honour, love, courage and betrayal.

Plot introduction

Set in a far-future fictional universe, Deathstalker Rebellion develops the plot and themes introduced in Deathstalker.

Sources, references, external links, footnotes
 

1996 British novels
British science fiction novels